The Canongate Myth Series is a series of novellas published by the independent Scottish publisher Canongate Books, in which ancient myths from various cultures are reimagined and rewritten. The project was conceived in 1999 by Jamie Byng, owner of Canongate, and the first three titles in the series were published on 21 October 2005. Though the initial novellas received mixed-to-positive reviews, the project was heralded by many in the press as "bold" and "ambitious", with the tabloid Metro calling it "one of the most ambitious acts of mass storytelling in recent years".

The series is intended to have an international focus, with contributing authors that have included Russian writer Victor Pelevin and Israeli author David Grossman. Also, the first title in the series, Karen Armstrong's A Short History of Myth, was published the same day in 33 countries and 28 languages, in what The Washington Post called "the biggest simultaneous publication ever". As of 2008, nine books have been published in the series, with Byng hoping to eventually publish 100.

Three titles were published in the United Kingdom on 1 November 2007: Binu and the Great Wall by Su Tong, Girl Meets Boy by Ali Smith, and Where Three Roads Meet by Salley Vickers. Installments in the series are also forthcoming from the authors A. S. Byatt, Chinua Achebe and Natsuo Kirino.

Michel Faber's contribution, The Fire Gospel, was published in 2008. 2009 saw the publication of Baba Yaga Laid an Egg by Dubravka Ugrešić and The Hurricane Party by Klas Östergren.

Orphans of Eldorado by Milton Hatoum and The Good Man Jesus and the Scoundrel Christ by Philip Pullman were published in 2010.

List of titles

References

External links
 TheMyths.co.uk, Canongate Myths official site
 The Good Man Jesus and the Scoundrel Christ, official book page

Parallel literature
Novel series
Canongate Books books
Series of books
Book series introduced in 2005